Granville is a town in Addison County, Vermont, United States. The population was 301 at the 2020 census. The town was originally called Kingston but was renamed in 1833.

Granville was one of thirteen Vermont towns isolated by flooding caused by Hurricane Irene in 2011.

Geography
Granville is located in the eastern corner of Addison County. The villages of Granville and Lower Granville are located in a valley in the center of the town, with the Northfield Mountains rising to the east and the main crest of the Green Mountains rising to the west. Vermont Route 100 runs north-south through the main valley in the town, passing through Granville Notch in the northern part of the town before beginning its descent to the north into Warren. Route 100 leads south to Hancock and Rochester. The eastern portion of town, including the village of East Granville, is notable in that there is no direct road connection from there to either the main settlement of Granville, or anywhere else in Addison County. Vermont Route 12A runs north-south through this portion of town and connects to Roxbury (in Washington County, to the north) and Braintree (in Orange County, to the south). The Long Trail passes briefly through the western part of the town, crossing the summit of Little Hans Peak.

Demographics

As of the census of 2000, there were 303 people, 127 households, and 81 families residing in the town.  The population density was 5.8 people per square mile (2.2/km2).  There were 218 housing units at an average density of 4.2 per square mile (1.6/km2).  The racial makeup of the town was 97.36% White, 0.33% African American, 1.32% Native American, 0.33% Pacific Islander, and 0.66% from two or more races. Hispanic or Latino of any race were 0.99% of the population.

There were 127 households, out of which 33.1% had children under the age of 18 living with them, 46.5% were married couples living together, 11.8% had a female householder with no husband present, and 36.2% were non-families. 28.3% of all households were made up of individuals, and 4.7% had someone living alone who was 65 years of age or older.  The average household size was 2.39 and the average family size was 2.83.

In the town, the age distribution of the population shows 24.4% under the age of 18, 5.9% from 18 to 24, 34.7% from 25 to 44, 23.4% from 45 to 64, and 11.6% who were 65 years of age or older.  The median age was 38 years. For every 100 females, there were 100.7 males.  For every 100 females age 18 and over, there were 106.3 males.

The median income for a household in the town was $32,679, and the median income for a family was $31,750. Males had a median income of $25,227 versus $25,179 for females. The per capita income for the town was $14,453.  About 8.7% of families and 11.5% of the population were below the poverty line, including 24.1% of those under the age of eighteen and none of those 65 or over.

Education

Granville residents in grades Pre-K–K and 5–6 attend Granville/Hancock Village School in Granville, grades  1–4 attend Granville/Hancock Village School in Hancock and grades 7–12 attend Harwood Union High School in South Duxbury, Whitcomb Junior/Senior High School in Bethel or Rochester High School in Rochester.

References

External links
 Town of Granville official website

 
Towns in Vermont
Towns in Addison County, Vermont